The 2022–23 Calgary Flames season is the Flames' 43rd season in Calgary, and the 51st season for the Flames' National Hockey League franchise that was established on June 6, 1972. The opening game was held on October 13, 2022, against Colorado.

Standings

Divisional standings

Conference standings

Schedule and results

Regular season

Player statistics 
As of February 25, 2023

Skaters

Goaltenders 

†Denotes player spent time with another team before joining the Flames. Stats reflect time with the Flames only.
‡Denotes player was traded mid-season. Stats reflect time with the Flames only.
Bold/italics denotes franchise record.

Roster

Transactions 
The Flames have been involved in the following transactions during the 2022–23 season.

Key:

 Contract is entry-level.
 Contract initially takes effect in the 2023–24 season.

Trades 

Notes:
 Florida will receive Calgary's 4th-round pick in 2026 instead if Florida's 1st-round pick in 2025 is within the top 2 selections.
 Calgary will receive Florida's 1st-round pick in 2026 instead if Florida's 1st-round pick in 2025 is within the top 2 selections.
 Montreal will have the option to receive Calgary's first-round pick in 2024 if the pick is outside of the top 20. If Montreal declines to exercise this option or Calgary's first-round pick in 2024 is within the top 20, they will receive one of Calgary or Florida's first-round picks in 2025 or 2026. If both Calgary and Florida's first-round picks in 2025 are outside of the top 10, Montreal will receive the earlier of the two. If Calgary's first-round pick in 2025 is in the top 10 and Florida's is outside, Montreal will receive Florida's first-round pick in 2025; if Florida's first-round pick in 2025 is in the top 10 and Calgary's outside, Montreal will receive Calgary's first-round pick in 2025. If both Calgary and Florida's first-round picks in 2025 are within the top 10, Montreal will receive Calgary's first-round pick, unless said pick is the first-overall selection in 2025; if it is, Montreal will instead receive the earlier of Calgary or Florida's first-round picks in 2026.
 Montreal will receive Calgary's third-round pick in 2025 if Calgary's first-round pick in 2025 is the first-overall selection and Florida's first-round pick in 2025 is in the top 10 selections; otherwise no pick will be exchanged.
 Montreal will receive Calgary's fourth-round pick in 2025 if both Calgary and Florida's first-round selections in 2025 are outside of the top 10, Florida's draft position is better than Calgary's, and the rights to Florida's first-round pick in 2025 are with another team; otherwise no pick will be exchanged.

Players acquired

Players lost

Signings

Draft picks 

Below are the Calgary Flames' selections at the 2022 NHL Entry Draft, which was held on July 7 to 8, 2022, at Bell Centre in Montreal.

References 

Calgary Flames seasons
Flames
Flames